Gareth Morgan is a British artist known for his acrylic on Perspex paintings of a robotic man. He is a Fine Arts graduate of Goldsmiths College in London, and is based in the United Kingdom. He has exhibited extensively all over the United Kingdom as well as in Moscow, Tel Aviv and Sotheby's in Amsterdam.

External links 
 "Gareth Robot" - (Morgan's homepage)
 Entry on the Oriel Washington Gallery's for an exhibition of Morgan's works
 Entry on the "Ar2Go" website about Morgan

1978 births
Alumni of Goldsmiths, University of London
20th-century British painters
British male painters
21st-century British painters
Living people
20th-century British male artists
21st-century British male artists